Marie Pierre "Mapie" de Toulouse-Lautrec (1901–1972) was a French journalist and food writer, born Marie Pierre Adélaïde Lévêque de Vilmorin in Verrières-le-Buisson, scion of the Vilmorin seed company. Her horticulturalist father was Joseph Marie Philippe Lévêque de Vilmorin (1872-1917), and her mother was the former Bertha Marie Mélanie de Gaufridy de Dortan (1876-1937). The writer Louise de Vilmorin (1902–1969) was her younger sister, while one of her younger brothers, Roger, was the result of an affair between her mother and Alfonso XIII of Spain. Her other siblings were Henri, Olivier, and André.

Career
Mapie de Toulouse-Lautrec started her career in journalism at Fémina magazine, where she had a society column, and wrote theatre reviews. After the war, Hélène Lazareff hired her as cookery columnist for Elle. She invented the detachable recipe card for that magazine (see the biographical link below, supplied by her publisher). Her recipes are elegant and original, and of an alluring simplicity. In 1961 she collected most of them in a book called La cuisine de Mapie. This collection was reprinted in 2004, with a preface by her daughter Adelaide.

Personal life
Mapie married twice; her husbands were:
Guy Marie Félix Levêque de Vilmorin (1896-1984), a cousin. They married on 17 March 1922 and divorced in 1932. They had three children, including a daughter, Adélaïde.
Guillaume de Toulouse-Lautrec Monfa, Comte de Toulouse-Lautrec (1902–1985), a nephew of the painter Henri de Toulouse-Lautrec. Married on 28 August 1933, they had two children, a daughter, Constance (born 1934, married Maurice Dumoncel), and a son, Charles-Constantine, Comte de Toulouse-Lautrec (born 1936, married Miranda Redfield).

Publications
ELLE cuisine, menus et recettes, Fayard, 1957
Les Recettes de Mapie, Hachette, 1958
Cuisine de France et du monde, Hachette, 1958
ELLE encyclopédie: 365 jours de cuisine, Fayard, 1959
Entrées et desserts, Fayard, 1961
La Cuisine de Mapie, Tallandier, 1967
Cuisinez vite et bien, Hachette, 1974
La Cuisine de Mapie, Tallandier, 2004

External links
Biography
Bibliography

French food writers
1901 births
1972 deaths
French women journalists
Women food writers
20th-century French journalists
20th-century French women writers
People from Verrières-le-Buisson
Elle (magazine) writers
Women cookbook writers